The Chow Hound is an animated short, directed by Frank Tashlin and first released in June, 1944. It is part of the Private Snafu series.

Plot 

The short is narrated by a bull from the Panhandle Valley. He is on his honey moon when the United States join World War II. He is inspired by an Uncle Sam poster to join the war effort and is processed as canned food. The cans marked with his smiling visage are then transported by truck, ship, and camel overseas to reach the hungry troops. 

The cans reach Snafu in the Pacific War zone, for as the bull's ghost has determined Snafu must eat, in spite of bomb and shrapnel blast. Snafu in fact waits first in line for the food and demands that food must be piled high on his tray. He then stuffs himself and throws away the leftovers. The ghost attacks the clueless soldier, and laments volunteering as food only to be wasted.

Sources

References

1944 films
1944 animated films
Private Snafu
Films directed by Frank Tashlin
Articles containing video clips
Films scored by Carl Stalling
Films produced by Leon Schlesinger
American black-and-white films
1944 comedy films
1940s Warner Bros. animated short films
1940s American films